The following is a list of episodes for the Nickelodeon television series The Troop. The series premiered on September 12, 2009. The episodes are arranged in broadcast order.

Series overview

Episodes

Season 1 (2009–10)

Season 2 (2011–13)
On March 12, 2010, it was announced that The Troop was renewed for a second season. In addition, Malese Jow and Matt Shively joined the cast. David Del Rio left the cast after the second episode of this season due to other commitments. After numerous delays, the season premiered on Saturday, June 25, 2011. After airing the 7th episode of the second series, Nickelodeon put the show on indefinite hiatus. The remaining episodes began airing in the United States Nicktoons beginning October 29, 2012. The remaining episodes were aired in the Netherlands, Belgium, Greece and Latin America. The last three episodes of the season aired May 6–8, 2013 on Nicktoons.

References 

General references that apply to most episodes
 
 

Troop
Troop
Troop
Troop
Troop
Troop